WWDP (channel 46) is a television station licensed to Norwell, Massachusetts, United States, serving the Boston area as an affiliate of ShopHQ. It is owned by WRNN-TV Associates alongside Foxborough-licensed WMFP (channel 62). Through a channel sharing agreement, the two stations transmit using WWDP's spectrum from a tower off Pleasant Street in West Bridgewater. WWDP's studios are located on Bert Drive, also in West Bridgewater.

Channel 46 had a precarious existence from its sign-on in 1986 until a decade later, including more than seven years off the air between 1989 and 1996. It was the first Boston-area home for Pax before Pax bought the stronger channel 68. Since, it has largely been leased out or used to air home shopping programming.

History

Early years 
The station first signed on the air on December 6, 1986, as WRYT, operating as an independent station from a bare-bones facility in Hanover. Owned by Robert Howe, a cable system owner from Alton, Illinois, WRYT operated from a tiny  tower originally designed for use as a translator. It broadcast at only 6,000 watts—the minimum transmitter power for a full-power station. All of the equipment—two tape decks, a mixer, a primitive character generator, a satellite receiver and an Emergency Broadcast System unit—was located in an old video store bathroom. Most of the programs were multicultural, from the International Satellite Network.

The station changed its call sign to WHRC on February 4, 1988, exchanging with another of Howe's broadcast properties, a radio station in Edwardsville, Illinois. Two months later, it began broadcasting from a considerably improved broadcast facility in Brockton. Its 952,000-watt effective radiated power gave it fairly decent coverage of the southern fringe of Greater Boston, and it had also managed to get carriage on cable throughout the market. However, the antenna was somewhat heavier than normal, and the owners feared that the tower could not handle the weight of ice buildup should winter weather hit the area. As a result, the station was forced to go off the air in November while a new site was found.

In January 1989, WHRC returned to the air from a transmitter in Foxborough, with considerably reduced power (at 501,000 watts). However, the site was not wired for three-phase power, as is usually the case with television transmitters. WHRC was forced to make do with diesel power, which was totally inadequate for a television transmitter. Two of the transmitter's three diesel generators had failed by the spring of 1989, leaving WHRC unable to broadcast in color for half of the time. The station had never been on solid financial ground, and the technical problems only hampered matters further.

By June, the owner, a California resident, was going through a divorce, which complicated his efforts to keep the station going. He stopped paying syndication distributors, the diesel fuel supplier and other creditors, and the employees' paychecks started to bounce. The station was put on the market, but there were no credible buyers. Finally, in September, the diesel fuel supplier refused to deliver any more fuel to power the transmitter facility. As a result, the station abruptly went off the air at 1:13 p.m. on September 19, 1989, when the last remaining diesel generator ran out of fuel. At the time, many of the employees had not been paid for eight weeks.

Attempts to use channel 46 were periodically made in the next several years, but the tower situation loomed over any and all potential users. In 1990, Steve Mindich, owner of the weekly Boston Phoenix newspaper, reached a deal to buy WHRC through his Rogue Television Corporation. Mindich planned to rename WPHX and also held a tentative deal to buy the silent WNHT in Concord, New Hampshire; the stations were to be affiliates of the planned Star Television Network, airing classic TV shows.

Mindich's deal, however, came undone because he could not secure a tower, a necessity if the station were to improve its facilities. In late 1991, another deal was struck to sell the station to Two if by Sea Broadcasting Corporation, headed by Michael Parker of Easton, Pennsylvania, who owned WTVE in Reading.

In 1995, Parker proposed the construction of a  tower in Bridgewater. The idea drew the ire of local residents. The planning board in Bridgewater denied the project, prompting Parker to sue.

Pax and shopping
Paxson Communications (now Ion Media Networks) took control of WHRC under a lease agreement, later buying the license. In December 1996, WHRC broadcast for the first time in more than seven years; it first aired religious programming before becoming an affiliate of the company's all-infomercial inTV network. On January 13, 1998, the station changed its call letters to WBPX, in anticipation of the pending launch of Pax TV (now Ion Television). It also added a (short-lived) local newscast. The station became a charter owned-and-operated station of Pax when the network launched on August 31 of that year.

In 1999, the WBPX call sign and Pax affiliation were transferred over to WABU (channel 68), an independent station that Paxson had recently acquired. Concurrently, Paxson Communications sold channel 46 to DP Media (named for Devon Paxson, son of Pax TV founder Lowell "Bud" Paxson), which changed the station's callsign to WWDP (standing for DP Media) and rejoined inTV. After just one year with that format, ZGS Communications took over the operations of WWDP under a local marketing agreement, running it as a full-powered repeater of Telemundo affiliate WTMU-LP.

On July 1, 2002, WWDP dropped the WTMU simulcast and affiliated with home shopping channel America's Collectibles Network. However, a few months later, WNEU (channel 60) was purchased by NBC to convert it into a full-power satellite of WTMU. ValueVision Media bought WWDP in 2003 and switched its affiliation to ShopNBC (now ShopHQ, which had previously been carried on WNEU). WWDP's Evine Live schedule was only interrupted by three hours of E/I programming that the Federal Communications Commission (FCC) requires full-power stations to air on a weekly basis.

On August 28, 2017, Evine Live (the former ValueVision Media) agreed to sell WWDP to WRNN-TV Associates for $10 million; the station concurrently entered into a channel sharing agreement to allow NRJ TV, owner of WMFP (channel 62), to operate WMFP on one-third of WWDP's spectrum. The sale was completed on December 6, 2017. Evine changed its name to ShopHQ on August 21, 2019.

On May 20, 2021, RNN and iMedia Brands announced an agreement to affiliate most of RNN's television stations (including WWDP) with home shopping network ShopHQ. WWDP had previously been carrying ShopHQ on its .2 subchannel. On June 28, 2021, WWDP began carrying ShopHQ as a primary affiliation, all Shop LC programming was dropped.

Technical information

Subchannels 

WWDP presents six subchannels on the multiplex shared with WMFP:

Analog-to-digital conversion 
In December 2008, WWDP received authorization by the FCC to temporarily shut down its digital signal, in order to allow the station to install a new antenna for the transmitter. Although the mandated date for full-power television stations to convert to digital-only broadcasts was postponed from February 17, 2009, to June 12, WWDP was able to activate its digital signal on February 17 as Providence, Rhode Island–based WJAR discontinued its analog signal on channel 10 on the original transition date. WWDP shut down its analog signal, over UHF channel 46, in April 2009. The station moved its digital signal from its pre-transition UHF channel 52, which was among the high band UHF channels (52-69) that were removed from broadcasting use as a result of the transition, to VHF channel 10. Through the use of PSIP, digital television receivers display the station's virtual channel as its former UHF analog channel 46.

See also 
 Channel 10 digital TV stations in the United States
 Channel 46 virtual TV stations in the United States
 List of United States over-the-air television networks#Shopping networks
 List of television stations in Massachusetts

References

External links 

Television channels and stations established in 1986
1986 establishments in Massachusetts
Norwell, Massachusetts
WDP
Quest (American TV network) affiliates
Mass media in Plymouth County, Massachusetts